Tarik El Janaby (born 29 June 1984) is a Moroccan-born Indonesian professional footballer who plays as a midfielder for Liga 3 club Adhyaksa Farmel.

Club career 
El Janaby spent most of his career in Asia, with Indonesian clubs Sriwijaya F.C., Arema FC, Bontang PKT and Pro Duta; Qatari club Al Ahli SC; Malaysian Pahang FA and Morocco League : Chabab Rif Al Hoceima.

RANS Cilegon
In 2021 Tarik El Janaby Returning Career In Indonesia Joined Indonesian Liga 2 Club RANS Cilegon. He made his debut on 5 October 2021 in a match against Persekat Tegal at the Gelora Bung Karno Madya Stadium, Jakarta. And Tarik scored his first goal for RANS Cilegon in the 36th minute against.

Career statistics

Honours

Club
RANS Cilegon
 Liga 2 runner-up: 2021

References

External links
 
 Tarik El Janaby at Liga Indonesia

1984 births
Living people
Indonesian footballers
Moroccan footballers
Moroccan expatriate footballers
Raja CA players
ES Beni-Khalled players
Sriwijaya F.C. players
Sri Pahang FC players
Arema F.C. players
PKT Bontang players
Pro Duta FC players
Al-Ahli Club (Manama) players
Chabab Rif Al Hoceima players
Sheikh Russel KC players
Kuantan FA players
RANS Nusantara F.C. players
Indonesian Premier Division players
Liga 2 (Indonesia) players
Expatriate footballers in Indonesia
Expatriate footballers in Tunisia
Expatriate footballers in Bahrain
Expatriate footballers in Malaysia
Expatriate footballers in Bangladesh
Moroccan expatriate sportspeople in Indonesia
Moroccan expatriate sportspeople in Malaysia
Moroccan expatriate sportspeople in Tunisia
Moroccan expatriate sportspeople in Bahrain
Association football midfielders
Naturalised citizens of Indonesia
Indonesian people of Moroccan descent